The Namibian Squash Association, or NSA, as it is known locally, is the governing body of squash in Namibia. The NSA is responsible for overseeing the development of the sport through junior development and ensuring the expansion of an active adult sports base. The NSA is affiliated with all necessary Namibian sports bodies in force to make the sport more popular and to remain part of an active Namibian sports landscape.

External links
 Official site

References 

National members of the World Squash Federation
Squash in Namibia
Sports governing bodies of Namibia